Sarcozona praecox, commonly known as sarcozona, is species of flowering plant in the family Aizoaceae and is endemic to Australia. It is a small erect to low-lying, succulent shrub with leaves that are triangular in cross-section and arranged in opposite pairs, and daisy-like flowers with twenty to eighty pink, petal-like staminodes and 20 to 150 stamens.

Description
The leaves are warty, triangular in cross-section but with the sides rounded and the top flat. There are between twenty and eight pink, petal-like staminodes surrounding between 20 and 150 white stamens and four styles.

Taxonomy
This species was first formally described in 1853 by Ferdinand von Mueller who gave it the name Mesembryathemum praecox in the journal Linnaea: ein Journal für die Botanik in ihrem ganzen Umfange, oder Beiträge zur Pflanzenkunde from specimens collected in the Flinders Ranges. In 1965, Stanley Thatcher Blake changed the name to Sarcozona praecox.

Distribution
Sarcozona grows near salt lakes, on granite rocks and occasionally in woodland and mallee in arid areas of western New South Wales, north-western Victoria, the south-west of Western Australia, southern South Australia and southern Queensland.

Conservation status
This species is classified as "not threatened" by the Government of Western Australia Department of Parks and Wildlife.

References

praecox
Taxa named by Ferdinand von Mueller
Plants described in 1853
Flora of South Australia
Flora of Western Australia
Flora of New South Wales
Flora of Victoria (Australia)
Flora of Queensland